Tigest Getent Mekonin, sometimes Tigist or Mekonen (born July 7, 1997 in Dembecha, Ethiopia) is a Bahraini steeplechase runner. She competed at the 2016 Summer Olympics in the women's 3000 metres steeplechase race; her time of 9:49.92 in the heats did not qualify her for the final.

In 2017, she competed in the women's 3000 metres steeplechase event at the 2017 World Championships in Athletics held in London, United Kingdom. She did not advance to compete in the final.

References

1997 births
Living people
Bahraini female steeplechase runners
Olympic athletes of Bahrain
Athletes (track and field) at the 2016 Summer Olympics
Athletes (track and field) at the 2018 Asian Games
Asian Games competitors for Bahrain
Islamic Solidarity Games competitors for Bahrain
20th-century Bahraini people
21st-century Bahraini people
Islamic Solidarity Games medalists in athletics